Crocodilia share an ancient relation with India. They are depicted along with many Hindu gods and goddesses in sculpture and painting. In the pre-historic period, seven species resided in India. The number has decreased to three primary species. The mugger (or marsh) crocodile (Crocodylus palustris) is found in lakes and rivers throughout the country. The saltwater crocodile (C. porosus) is found along the eastern coast of the country and the Nicobar and Andaman Islands. The gharial (Gavialis gangeticus) is found in river areas, though is greatly reduced from its previous range.

Family Crocodylidae

Mugger crocodile

The mugger crocodile is India's most common species. They are not as long as saltwater crocodiles. Until the British colonised India, crocodiles were never critically endangered. Afterwards, an Indian biologist (of American origin) named Romulus Whitaker established the Madras Crocodile Bank for conservation and breeding of crocodiles. Now, there are thousands of crocodiles in the Madras bank alone. Although, in rest of India, one can still see crocodiles in wild - in rivers and national parks.

Saltwater crocodile

The saltwater crocodile is found in the eastern states of Odisha, West Bengal, Andhra Pradesh and Tamil Nadu as well as the Nicobar and Andaman Islands. The largest specimen was found in Odisha, and reached . Its population numbers about 300. Saltwater crocodiles live in the mangroves of Bhittarkanika and Sunderbans, Mahanadi Delta, and in the swamplands in Odisha and West Bengal (including rivers).

Family Gavialidae

The largest gharial in the wilderness was a specimen which measured , and was found River Girwa, at Katarniaghat Wildlife Sanctuary. It is the rarest crocodilian species. Only four were left in 1975 when Whitaker started a breeding programme of gharials. Their population has increased to about 1000. Earlier, they were found in rivers from Japan to Spain. They are now limited to India, Bangladesh and Nepal. It is found in only some rivers of India which include:
Chambal
Girwa
Ganges
Yamuna
Kali
Kosi
Gandak

Human intervention
Crocodile farms are used mainly for conservation and breeding programs. In January 2019, a controversial programme to relocate 300 crocodiles from the area of the Statue of Unity in Gujarat started.

See also

Madras Crocodile Bank Trust
List of reptiles of South Asia

References

Further reading
 Volume 1, Issue 616 of Five cent wide awake library
"Crocodiles: Proceedings of the 6th Working Meeting of the Crocodile Specialist Group of the Species Survival Commission...". IUCN. 1984. pp. 29–32.

India
Reptiles of India